Jo Boer (22 February 1895 – 12 February 1971) was a Dutch architect. His work was part of the architecture event in the art competition at the 1936 Summer Olympics.

References

1895 births
1971 deaths
20th-century Dutch architects
Olympic competitors in art competitions
People from Groningen (city)